Exodus Global Alliance is a Christian organization that seeks to advocate "ex-gay" movements by promoting the idea that gay people can change their homosexuality, or in their own words, help bring "healing" and "freedom" to people "struggling with homosexual behaviour".

History
Exodus Global Alliance was formed out of Exodus International in 2004. Exodus International pulled out of Exodus Global Alliance on 28 May 2013.

References

External links
Exodus Global Alliance

Christian advocacy groups
Organizations in the ex-gay movement
Religious organizations based in Canada